Csák is a Hungarian surname. Notable people with the surname include:

Elemér Csák (born 1944), Hungarian journalist
Ibolya Csák, Hungarian athlete
István Csák, Hungarian hockey player
József Csák, Hungarian judoka

Hungarian-language surnames